Petra Ševčíková (born 1 September 2000) is a Czech racing cyclist. In November 2020, she competed in the women's team sprint event at the 2020 UEC European Track Championships in Plovdiv, Bulgaria.

References

2000 births
Living people
Czech female cyclists
Place of birth missing (living people)
Cyclists at the 2019 European Games
European Games competitors for the Czech Republic